Like the Actors E.P. is an EP of the band Eisley released December 18, 2007 on Reprise Records. The EP contains the proper version of "Sun Feet", as well as B-Sides from Combinations.

Track listing

Eisley albums
2007 EPs